Fushan is a district of the city of Yantai, Shandong province, near the shore of the Bohai Gulf.

To the east is Zhifu District and Laishan District, to the southeast is Muping District, to the southwest Qixia City, to the northwest is Penglai City, and to the north is the Yantai Economic and Technological Development Zone.

The District of Fushan was mentioned in the Jackie Chan action film Police Story 3.

Administrative divisions
As 2012, this district is divided to 7 subdistricts and 3 towns.
Subdistricts

Towns
Gaotuan
Zhanggezhuang
Huili
Zangjiazhuang

References

External links 
 Information page
 China Daily report on Fushan's economy

County-level divisions of Shandong
Yantai